The Man in the Moonlight is a 1919 American silent drama film a set in the great north, starring Colleen Moore and Monroe Salisbury.

Plot
Two strangers arrive at the wedding of Sergeant O'Farrell of the Royal Mounted Police and Rosine Delorme. O'Farrell receives an urgent message that Rosine's wayward brother Louis has escaped from prison with the notorious Rossingnol. He puts off the nuptials and leaves in search of the criminals. One of the strangers convinces Rosine to guide him to a cabin at the end of the Passage Du Mort where Louis awaits her. The cabin however is empty, the stranger is actually Rossingnol. Rossingnol carries Rosine to a bed and hypnotizes her.

In the meanwhile Louis, wounded, warns the police are on their way. Rossingnol has Louis take Rosine. At his signal (a gunshot) Louis and Rosine must run for the border with America. The police shoot Rossingnol and Louis and Rosine bolt. Rossingnol dies in the arms of his love, who has followed him, and hide in the bushes until they hear a shot to signal them to head for the border. After Rossingnol is shot and dies in the arms of his sweetheart who followed him to the cabin, O'Farrell joins Rosine and Louis in the United States.

Cast
 Monroe Salisbury as Rossingnol
 Colleen Moore as Rosine Delorme	
 William Stowell as Sergeant O'Farrell	
 Alfred Allen as Captain Hendricks
 Harry DuRoy as Ferguson
 Sydney Franklin as Pierre Delorme
 Virginia Foltz as Mother Delorme
 Arthur Jasmine as Louis Delorme

Background
The Man in the Moonlight came between Colleen's work for the Selig Polyscope Company and the Christie Studios. At the time, she was still almost exclusively a dramatic actress and had no comic training. Her roles up to that point (and typical for motion picture roles for women in the motion picture industry at the time), she was a damsel in distress.

Preservation status
A 35mm print of this film is in the collection of George Eastman House.

References

Bibliography
Jeff Codori (2012), Colleen Moore; A Biography of the Silent Film Star, McFarland Publishing, Print , EBook

External links

The Man in the Moonlight at IMDB
Man in the Moonlight at TCM Database
Man in the Moonlight at NY Times
lantern slide

1919 films
1919 drama films
Silent American drama films
American silent feature films
Films directed by Paul Powell (director)
Universal Pictures films
American black-and-white films
1910s American films